The American Association of Base Ball Clubs (AA)  was a professional baseball league that existed for 10 seasons from  to . At the end of its run, several AA franchises joined the NL. After 1891, the NL existed alone, with each season's champions being awarded the Temple Cup (1894–1897).

During its existence, the AA was often simply referred to as "the Association" in the media, in contrast to the NL, which was sometimes called "the League".

History
The American Association distinguished itself in several ways from what it considered to be the puritanical National League. The new league established teams in what the NL leaders pejoratively called "river cities", including Pittsburgh, Cincinnati, Louisville and St. Louis, with the inherent implication of lower morality or social standards in those cities.  In contrast to the NL, the AA offered cheaper ticket prices, Sunday games and alcoholic beverages to its patrons. 

On November 8, 1881, at the Gibson House in Cincinnati, it was decided that individual teams in the league-to-be would operate their own affairs and set their own admission prices, under an agreement called the "guarantee system". The NL at that time prohibited the sale of alcohol on its grounds, while the AA had no such restrictions, especially as several of its teams were backed by breweries and distilleries. The AA became known as "The Beer and Whiskey League", another pejorative term applied by NL owners, and which did not seem to bother the fans of the Association's clubs.

Beginning in 1884 and continuing through 1890, the champion of the AA met the champion of the NL in an early version of the World Series. These early Series were less organized than the modern version, with as few as three games played and as many as fifteen, and the contests of 1885 and 1890 ending in disputed ties. The NL won four of these Series, while the AA won only one, in 1886 when the St. Louis Browns (now Cardinals) defeated the Chicago White Stockings (now Cubs).

Over its lifetime, the AA was weakened by several factors. One was the tendency of some of its teams to jump to the NL. The consistently stronger NL was in better position to survive adverse conditions. Some owners of AA teams also owned a NL team. In a rare historical oddity, the Brooklyn Bridegrooms (now the Los Angeles Dodgers) won the league's championship and represented the AA in the 1889 World Series, switched to the NL during the off-season, and then repeated the same feat.

No player who spent the majority of his career in the AA is in the baseball Hall of Fame, although Bid McPhee of the Cincinnati Reds played eight of his eighteen seasons in the AA before the Reds moved to the National League. The living legacy of the old Association is the group of teams that came over to the National League to stay. The Pirates moved to the NL after the 1886 season, the Bridegrooms/Dodgers and the Cincinnati Reds after the 1889 season, and the Browns/Cardinals after the American Association folded following the 1891 season. Following the reorganization and contraction of the NL from 12 teams down to 8 in 1900, half of the eight surviving teams were former members of the AA. Several of the AA's home-field venues survived into the 1960s: The ballpark used by the 1891 Washington club evolved into Griffith Stadium; the home of the St. Louis Browns, Sportsman's Park; and the city block occupied by the Reds, which evolved into Crosley Field. Crosley was the last physical remnant of the AA to go, other than the clubs themselves, when it was replaced by Riverfront Stadium in mid-1970.

During the AA's existence, several teams defected over to the NL, and at the AA's demise in 1891 four additional clubs joined the NL.  Four former AA clubs, the Pittsburgh Pirates (defected to the NL in 1887), the Cincinnati Reds (defected to the NL in 1889), the Los Angeles Dodgers (defected in 1890) and the St. Louis Cardinals (joined the NL after the AA demise in 1891), have posted more than 10,000 lifetime major league victories.

Pennant winners of the AA
1882 Cincinnati Red Stockings
1883 Philadelphia Athletics
1884 New York Metropolitans (lost World Series, 3–0, to Providence NL)
1885 St. Louis Browns (tied World Series, 3–3–1, with Chicago NL)
1886 St. Louis Browns (won World Series, 4–2, over Chicago NL)
1887 St. Louis Browns (lost World Series, 10–5, to Detroit NL)
1888 St. Louis Browns (lost World Series, 6–2, to New York NL)
1889 Brooklyn Bridegrooms (lost World Series, 6–3, to New York NL)
1890 Louisville Colonels (tied World Series, 3–3–1, with Brooklyn NL)
1891 Boston Reds

American Association franchises

Timeline

The 1884 Washington Statesmen were replaced during the season by the Richmond Virginians.
For the 1891 season, the Philadelphia Athletics were replaced by the Philadelphia Quakers of the Player's League.
The 1891 Cincinnati Kelly's Killers folded during the season and were replaced by the Milwaukee Brewers.

1882 – AA forms with six teams
1883 – AA expands to eight teams
1884 – AA expands to twelve teams in response to Union Association threat
1885 – AA returns to eight teams
1887 – Allegheny ("Pittsburgh Alleghenys") leave AA to join NL
1889 – Cleveland Spiders leave AA to join NL
1890 – Cincinnati Red Stockings and Brooklyn Bridegrooms leave AA to join NL
1892 – Baltimore Orioles, Louisville Colonels, St. Louis Browns, and Washington Senators join National League after the folding of the AA

AA presidents
H. D. McKnight (1882–1885)
Wheeler C. Wyckoff (1886–1889)
Zach Phelps (1890)
Allen W. Thurman (1890–1891)
Louis Kramer (1891)
Ed Renau (1891)
Zach Phelps (1891)

Notes

References
General

Specific

External links
"American Association Remembered", MLB.com

 
Sports leagues established in 1882
1882 establishments in the United States
1891 disestablishments in the United States
Defunct major baseball leagues in the United States
Articles which contain graphical timelines